Der var engang en vicevært is a 1937 Danish family film directed by Lau Lauritzen Jr. and Alice O'Fredericks and written by Børge Müller. The film stars Osvald Helmuth and Connie Meiling.

Cast
 Osvald Helmuth ... Vicevært Christensen
 Connie Meiling ... Connie
 Victor Borge ... Komponist Bøegh ... credited as Børge Rosenbaum
 Sigurd Langberg ... Direktør Haller
 Asta Hansen ... Asta Haller
 Poul Reichhardt ... Paul
 Inger Stender ... Den lyse Inger
 Lulu Ziegler ... Sangerinden Lulu
 Sigfred Pedersen ... Digteren Sigfred
 Thorkil Lauritzen... Onkel Aksel
 Erika Voigt ... Tante Eulalia
 Bjørn Spiro ... Sagfører Birck
 Lau Lauritzen
 Tove Wallenstrøm ... Girl being picked up in the road

References

External links
 
 Der var engang en vicevært at the Danish Film Database

1937 films
Danish black-and-white films
1930s Danish-language films
Films directed by Lau Lauritzen Jr.
Films directed by Alice O'Fredericks
Danish children's films
Danish comedy-drama films
1937 comedy-drama films
Danish drama films